Lesslie is a census-designated place located in York County, South Carolina, United States, southeast of the city of Rock Hill. In 2010, Lesslie had a total population of 2,882 people.

While Lesslie is sometimes considered to be a town, it is not incorporated and does not have a town council or mayor. Lesslie is a fast-growing suburban area a part of the Charlotte Metro along Interstate 77, which can be accessed from exits 75 and 77.

Geography

Climate and meteorology
Lesslie has a Humid subtropical climate, Cfa in the Köppen climate classification, characterized as humid, wet summers and cool, dry winters. The coldest temperature in the area was -6 °F while the warmest was 108 °F, both recorded at the Rock Hill Municipal Airport. Lesslie receives a large amount of precipitation throughout the year, with at least 3.3 in (84 mm) of precipitation occurring each month on average.

Demographics

2020 census

As of the 2020 United States census, there were 3,068 people, 1,127 households, and 852 families residing in the CDP.

2000 census
As of the census of 2000, there were 2,268 people, 888 households, and 666 families residing in the CDP. The population density was 381.8 people per square mile (147.4/km2). There were 961 housing units at an average density of 161.8/sq mi (62.5/km2). The racial makeup of the CDP was 93.30% White, 3.97% African American, 1.37% Native American, 0.26% Asian, 0.00% Pacific Islander, 0.18% from other races, and 0.93% from two or more races. 0.49% of the population were Hispanic or Latino of any race.

There were 888 households, out of which 32.9% had children under the age of 18 living with them, 60.4% were married couples living together, 9.7% had a female householder with no husband present, and 25.0% were non-families. 20.3% of all households were made up of individuals, and 6.2% had someone living alone who was 65 years of age or older. The average household size was 2.55 and the average family size was 2.94.

In the CDP, the population was spread out, with 24.3% under the age of 18, 7.8% from 18 to 24, 31.7% from 25 to 44, 25.3% from 45 to 64, and 10.8% who were 65 years of age or older. The median age was 37 years. For every 100 females, there were 100.9 males. For every 100 females age 18 and over, there were 100.5 males.

The median income for a household in the CDP was $44,167, and the median income for a family was $52,125. Males had a median income of $35,441 versus $26,507 for females. The per capita income for the CDP was $19,215. 6.6% of the population and 4.9% of families were below the poverty line. 5.8% of those under the age of 18 and 7.0% of those 65 and older were living below the poverty line.

See also
Riverview, South Carolina
India Hook, South Carolina

References

Census-designated places in South Carolina
Census-designated places in York County, South Carolina